Wehrli is a Swiss surname. Notable people with the surname include:

Grant Wehrli, American politician
Hans Wehrli (1927–2011), Swiss sprinter
Heinz Wehrli (born 1953), Swiss equestrian
Josef Wehrli (born 1954), Swiss racing cyclist
 Max Wehrli (1909–1998), Swiss Germanist 
Max Wehrli (athlete) (1930–2014), Swiss decathlete
Mathias Wehrli (born 1962), Swiss football defender
 Roger Wehrli (born 1947), American football player
Roger Wehrli (footballer) (born 1956), Swiss football midfielder
 Ursus Wehrli (born 1969), Swiss comedian and artist
 Werner Wehrli (1892–1944), Swiss composer